Barry Evan Sterling (November 17, 1943 – April 19, 2014) was an American businessman and politician.

From Memphis, Tennessee, Sterling co-owned Sterling Company Realtors and was a probation officer in the juvenile court system. He served in the Tennessee House of Representatives as a Republican.

Notes

1943 births
2014 deaths
Politicians from Memphis, Tennessee
Businesspeople from Tennessee
Republican Party members of the Tennessee House of Representatives
20th-century American businesspeople